Florin Sandu Maxim (born 2 March 1981) is a Romanian former professional footballer and currently a manager. He usually played as a left-back, but also played as a left midfielder for teams such as Aurul Brad, Unirea Alba Iulia, Sportul Studențesc or Farul Constanța, among others. Maxim had a very powerful shot and ability to score long-distance goals.

Career

Steaua București
Maxim started to play football in his home-town, Brad, Hunedoara, at CIF Aliman Academy. He also played for Aurul Brad and FC Corvinul Hunedoara. Seen by Victor Pițurcă as an excellent choice for the left-back position, Maxim was approached by Romania's most successful club, FC Steaua București. He was later loaned at Apullum Alba-Iulia.

Apullum Alba-Iulia
Florin Sandu Maxim made an excellent season in Alba-Iulia. He started regularly in the first 11. In 29 games, Maxim scored 5 goals.

UM Timișoara
Maxim's goals took him in the Liga I, at CSP UM Timișoara. His debut in the first Romanian division took place on 5 August 2001, when UMT lost at home against FC Rapid București, 0–3.

Sportul Studențesc
Soon after his debut on Liga I, Maxim signed with Sportul Studențesc. He was prepared, among other, by well-known Romanian coach Ioan Andone. Maxim helped his team finish 4th in the 2005–2006 season. Financial problems caused the relegation of Sportul Studențesc. Some players left and Maxim was transferred by FC Farul Constanța. The left-back came back to Sportul Studențesc in August 2010.

Farul Constanța
Florin Maxim was an important player for FC Farul Constanța. He showed his leadership skills and became captain of the team.

Poli Timișoara
In 2009, Florin Maxim signed a 3-year contract with FC Politehnica Timișoara. The coach Gavril Balint insisted for his transfer. Maxim scored his first goal for Politehnica Timișoara in a 4–1 victory against Gloria Buzău.

Petrolul Ploiești
In April 2012, Maxim signed a contract for a couple of months with Petrolul Ploiești, with an extension clause for another year.

Romanian Under-21 national team
Florin Maxim was called for the Romania national under-21 football team, where he played 8 times.

Honours

Manager
Viitorul Șelimbăr
Liga III: 2020–21

Statistics

References

External links

 
 

1981 births
Living people
People from Brad, Hunedoara
Romanian footballers
Association football midfielders
CS Corvinul Hunedoara players
FC Steaua București players
CSM Unirea Alba Iulia players
FC Sportul Studențesc București players
FCV Farul Constanța players
FC Politehnica Timișoara players
FC Petrolul Ploiești players
CS Concordia Chiajna players
FC Voluntari players
Liga I players
Liga II players
Romanian football managers
CSC 1599 Șelimbăr managers
CS Corvinul Hunedoara managers